Manuel Gião (born 28 June 1971, in Lisbon) is a Portuguese racing driver. He has competed in such series as Euro Open by Nissan, Italian Formula 3000, International GT Open and the German Formula Three Championship. He represented Portugal many times in the EFDA Nations Cup.

He was the Spanish GT Championship Super GT class joint-champion in 2010, and the overall champion in 2011.

References

External links
 

1971 births
Living people
Sportspeople from Lisbon
Portuguese racing drivers
German Formula Three Championship drivers
Auto GP drivers
Euroformula Open Championship drivers
EFDA Nations Cup drivers
International GT Open drivers
SEAT León Eurocup drivers

G+M Escom Motorsport drivers
24H Series drivers
TCR Europe Touring Car Series drivers